Jonathan H. Hausman (born June 19, 1957) is an American Conservative rabbi.

He is the rabbi of Congregation Ahavath Torah in Stoughton, Massachusetts.

Hausman grew up in the Bridgeport, Connecticut area. He holds a BA in Judaic Studies, and an MA in International Affairs focusing on the Middle East, from the George Washington University, and a  JD from Emory University in addition to Rabbinic ordination from Tifereth Israel Rabbinical Yeshiva. He used to be the rabbi of Congregation Sinai of West Haven, Connecticut.

Hausman is the model for the title character in author Jacob Appel's first mystery novel, Wedding Wipeout:  A Rabbi Kappelmacher Mystery, in which Kappelmacher solves murders though "rabbinic reasoning."

Notes

American Conservative rabbis
Living people
Elliott School of International Affairs alumni
Emory University School of Law alumni
1957 births